Belvidere, also known as the Exum Newby House and Lamb House, is a historic plantation house located at Belvidere, Perquimans County, North Carolina.   It was built about 1767, and is a -story, five bay, frame dwelling with an unusual hip on gambrel roof.  The Georgian style dwelling is sheathed in weatherboard and rests on a brick pier foundation.  In the mid-1970s, Belvidere was sold to radio personality Wolfman Jack.

The house was added to the National Register of Historic Places in 1977.

References

External links

Plantation houses in North Carolina
Historic American Buildings Survey in North Carolina
Houses on the National Register of Historic Places in North Carolina
Georgian architecture in North Carolina
Houses completed in 1767
Houses in Perquimans County, North Carolina
National Register of Historic Places in Perquimans County, North Carolina
1767 establishments in North Carolina